Linton is a surname of English and Scottish origin. It can also be used as a unisex given name.

Surname
Arthur Linton (1868–1896), British cycling champion
David Linton (1906–1971), British geographer and geomorphologist
David Linton (1815–1889), U.S. college fraternity founder
Doug Linton (born 1965), Major League Baseball pitcher
Edwin Linton (1855–1939), American helminthologist and parasitologist
Eliza Lynn Linton (1822–1898), British novelist and essayist
Hercules Linton (1837–1900), Scottish shipbuilder
J. Linton, Scottish footballer
James Linton, Anglican bishop in Persia
James Dromgole Linton (1840-1916), painter
John Wallace Linton (1905–1943), Welsh recipient of the Victoria Cross
Joseph Ivor Linton (1900–1982), Israeli diplomat
Louise Linton (born 1980), Scottish actress
Marigold Linton (born 1936), American psychologist and president of SACNAS
Martin Linton (born 1944), British politician
Mildred Linton (1909–2003), better known as Karen Morley, American actor and political activist
Ralph Linton (1893–1953), American anthropologist
Sydney Linton (died 1894), Australian bishop
Tom Linton (born 1975), American guitarist in the band Jimmy Eat World
William Linton (disambiguation), several people

First name
Linton Park (artist) (1826-1906), American folk artist
Linton Lomas Barrett (1904–1972), educator and translator
Linton Garner (1915–2003), Jazz pianist
Linton Johnson (born 1980), professional basketball player
Linton Kwesi Johnson (born 1952), British-Jamaican Dub poet
Linton Owe, Swedish entrepreneur
John Linton Roberson (born 1969), American cartoonist and writer
Linton Sirait (born 1956), Indonesian District Court judge
Linton Stephens Hopkins (born 1966), American Chef and Restaurateur

See also

Linton (disambiguation)